Claus Rickmers was a  cargo ship which was built in 1923 for Rickmers Reederei AG. She was sunk by Allied bombing at Larvik, Norway in 1945 and then salvaged and towed to Bergen for repairs. She was then seized as a war prize) and ownership passed to the Ministry of War Transport (MoWT), being renamed Empire Carron on completion of repairs in 1947.

She was then sold and renamed Andrian. In 1949, she was sold to Panamanian owners and renamed San Nicolas, serving until scrapped in 1964.

Description
The ship was built by Norderwerft AG, Wesermünde as yard number 193. She was launched on 23 November 1923 and completed on 22 February 1924.

She had a GRT of 5,125 and a NRT of 3,170. Her DWT was 8,040.

The engine was built by AG Weser, Bremen.

History
Claus Rickmers was built for Rickmers Reederei AG, Hamburg. The Code Letters RDVL were allocated and her port of registry was Hamburg. On 13 September 1928, she was in collision with the Italian cargo ship  at Glückstadt and was beached. In 1934, her Code Letters were changed to DHEE.

On 21 October 1944 the German cargo ship , struck a mine off Stora Pölsan, Sweden. Hohenhörn sank in no more than eight minutes. The entire crew was rescued by Claus Rickmers and landed in Germany. Hohenhörn was on a voyage from Narvik, Norway to Emden, Germany with a cargo of 4,000 tonnes of iron pyrites.

On 9 January 1945, Claus Rickmers was damaged in an Allied air raid on Lervik, Norway. On 15 January 1945, a formation of sixteen Mosquito aircraft of the Banff Strike Wing, comprising aircraft from 143, 235, 248 and 333 Squadrons, Royal Air Force, led by Wing Commander Max Guedj attacked the damaged Claus Rickmers. Also attacked were the flak ships Seehund  and O B Rogge and Räumboot R 34. Five Mosquitos and three Focke-Wulf Fw 190s of 9 Staffeln, Jagdgeschwader 5 were shot down in the attack. Claus Rickmers was towed to Bergen for repairs.

In May 1945, she was seized as a war prize and passed to the MoWT. Repairs were completed in 1947 and she was renamed Empire Carron. The United Kingdom Official Number 181642 was allocated. She was then sold to S G Empiricos Ltd, London and renamed Andrian. In 1949, Andrian was sold to Compagnia Navigazione Yaviza, Panama and renamed San Nicolas. She served until 1964, arriving at Spezia, Italy in December 1964 for scrapping.

References

1923 ships
Ships built in Bremen (state)
Steamships of Germany
Merchant ships of Germany
Maritime incidents in 1928
World War II merchant ships of Germany
Maritime incidents in January 1945
Ministry of War Transport ships
Empire ships
Steamships of the United Kingdom
Merchant ships of the United Kingdom
Steamships of Panama
Merchant ships of Panama